I briganti is an opera (melodramma) in three acts by Saverio Mercadante, first performed on 22 March 1836 by the Théâtre-Italien in Paris, with an Italian libretto by  based on Schiller's Die Räuber. The lead roles were written for bass Luigi Lablache, tenor Giovanni Battista Rubini, baritone Antonio Tamburini and soprano Giulia Grisi. The opera did not do well in Paris, and the cast departed for London.

Performance history
The opera was also performed in Italian at The King's Theatre in London with the same lead singers, beginning on 2 July 1836; at the Teatro San Benedetto in Venice on 30 September 1836; in Milan on 6 November 1837; in Cagliari, Sardinia, in the autumn of 1837; in Lisbon on 16 September 1838; at the Teatro San Carlo in Naples in the winter season of 1839; in Madrid on 12 December 1839; in Malta in 1840; and in Corfu in 1844. It was revived in Malta in 1886.

It was revived for the Rossini in Wildbad festival in 2012 and an audio recording was issued.

Roles

Recording
 2012:  (Massimiliano), Maxim Mironov (Ermano), Vittorio Prato (Corrado), Petya Ivanova (Amelia), Rosita Fiocco (Teresa). Virtuosi Brunensis, conducted by Antonino Fogliani. Live recording at Rossini in Wildbad on 14, 18 and 21 July 2012. Naxos Records.

Notes

Bibliography
 Ashbrook, William (1982). Donizetti and His Operas. Cambridge: Cambridge University Press. .
 Loewenberg, Alfred (1978). Annals of Opera 1597–1940 (third edition, revised). Totowa, New Jersey: Rowman and Littlefield. .
 Marek, Dan H. (2013). Giovanni Battista Rubini and the Bel Canto Tenors: History and Technique. Lanham, MD: Scarecrow Press. .
 Ripley, George; Dana, Charles Anderson, editors (1879). "Mercadante, Saverio", vol. 11, p. 398, in The American Cyclopaedia: A Popular Dictionary of General Knowledge, 2nd edition, revised. New York: D. Appleton.
 Rose, Michael (1992a). "I Briganti", vol. 1, p. 603, in The New Grove Dictionary of Opera, four volumes, edited by Stanley Sadie. London: Macmillan. .
 Rose, Michael (1992b). "Mercadante, (Giuseppe) Saverio (Raffaele)", vol. 3, pp. 334–339, in The New Grove Dictionary of Opera, four volumes, edited by Stanley Sadie. London: Macmillan. .
 Wittmann, Michael (2001). "Mercadante, (Giuseppe) Saverio (Raffaele)" in The New Grove Dictionary of Music and Musicians, 2nd edition, edited by Stanley Sadie. London: Macmillan.  (hardcover).  (eBook).

External links
 
 "The Italian opera at Paris", The Musical World, vol. 1, no. 4 (8 April 1836)
 Libretto for London (1836), in Italian with English translation
 Libretto for Milan (1837), in Italian

Operas
1836 operas
Operas by Saverio Mercadante
Operas based on works by Friedrich Schiller